Zurab Margania is the current Chairman of the State Security Service of Abkhazia. He was appointed on 29 September 2014 by newly elected President Raul Khajimba.

References

Living people
Chairmen of the State Security Service of Abkhazia
Year of birth missing (living people)
Place of birth missing (living people)